Franz Baader (15 June 1959, Spalt) is a German computer scientist at Dresden University of Technology.

He received his PhD in Computer Science in 1989 from the University of Erlangen-Nuremberg, Germany, where he was a teaching and research assistant for 4 years. 
In 1989, he went to the German Research Centre for Artificial Intelligence (DFKI) as a senior researcher and project leader.

In 1993 he became associate professor for computer science at RWTH Aachen, and in 2002 full professor for computer science at TU Dresden.

He received the Herbrand Award for the year 2020 "in recognition of his significant contributions to unification theory, combinations of theories and reasoning in description logics".

Works

References

German computer scientists
Living people
1959 births
People from Roth (district)